Moussa Kyabou (born 18 April 1998) is a Malian professional footballer who plays as a defensive midfielder for Sheriff Tiraspol and the Mali national team.

Club career
On 15 March 2021, Sheriff Tiraspol announced the signing of Kyabou on loan from USC Kita.

Career statistics

References

External links

Living people
1998 births
Sportspeople from Bamako
Malian footballers
Association football midfielders
Mali international footballers
FC Sheriff Tiraspol players
Moldovan Super Liga players
2020 African Nations Championship players
21st-century Malian people
Malian expatriate footballers
Malian expatriate sportspeople in Moldova
Expatriate footballers in Moldova
Mali A' international footballers